Herbert August Hippauf (May 9, 1939 – July 17, 1995) was an American professional baseball player and scout. His seven-year pro career (1960–1966) was highlighted by a brief, three-game trial with the  Atlanta Braves of Major League Baseball.

Hippauf spent his entire playing career in the Braves' organization, signing with them while they were still based in Milwaukee but not making the varsity until their first year in Atlanta in 1966.  During that season, he appeared in relief for the Braves in three early season games. In his MLB debut on April 27, Hippauf relieved starting pitcher Hank Fischer in the third inning of a scoreless game against the Los Angeles Dodgers at Dodger Stadium. He got through the third inning unscathed, but in the fourth, Hippauf surrendered four hits and three earned runs and was charged with his only Major League decision, a loss, as the Dodgers won 4–1. He relieved in two more games in early May before being sent to the Triple-A Richmond Braves, where he played the rest of the season, his last in pro ball.  All told, Hippauf yielded six hits and four earned runs in  Major League innings, with one base on balls and one strikeout.

Hippauf remained in baseball for many years, however, as a scout based in Sunnyvale, California, for the Braves, Houston Astros, Montreal Expos and Colorado Rockies. He was a national cross-checker for the Rockies when he died from cancer at age 56 in 1995. The Herb Hippauf Scouting Award, given in his memory, goes annually to the "individual who exemplifies loyalty, dedication, honesty, and is committed to doing what is in the best interest of the Colorado Rockies."

External links

References

1939 births
1995 deaths
American people of German descent
Atlanta Braves players
Atlanta Braves scouts
Austin Braves players
Austin Senators players
Baseball players from California
Boise Braves players
Colorado Rockies scouts
Deaths from cancer in California
Denver Bears players
Houston Astros scouts
Montreal Expos scouts
Pasadena City Lancers baseball players
Richmond Braves players
Sportspeople from Sunnyvale, California
Yakima Braves players